Khushboo Grewal (born 16 January 1984) also known as Khushboo Kochhar is an Indian playback singer and actress. She began her career as a VJ on B4U and then moved to Punjabi and Hindi films as an actor. She has acted in movies  such as Raaz: The Mystery Continues and Punjabi films  such as Carry on Jatta. She is mostly known as a playback singer, was recognised for the Meet Bros composition "Pink Lips" from the Bollywood movie Hate Story 2 She is also a lead vocalist of the Meet Bros band.

Early and personal life
Grewal, hailing from a family of doctors, graduated from MCM DAV College for Women, Chandigarh. She married entrepreneur Bipin Grewal in 2006. Together they have a daughter Shanaya.

Career

Grewal began her career in the entertainment industry as a VJ and then moved on to films (Punjabi and Hindi). As a VJ, she interviewed well known Bollywood celebrities. Grewal has also acted in Punjabi films such as Munde U.K. De, Carry On Jatta and Bhaji in Problem. She has also acted in TV serials such as Dil Dosti Dance, Rang Badalti Odhani, Chajje Chajje Ka Pyaar.

Grewal started her singing career with the title track of the 2013 Akshay Kumar starrer Boss as a backing vocalist and gained fame with the Hate Story 2 song "Pink Lips". Some of her other songs are "Selfiyaan" (Sharafat Gayi Tel Lene), "Lak Tunu Tunu" (Double Di Trouble), "Tu Takke" (Dharam Sankat Mein) and "Awesome Mora Mahiya" (Calendar Girls).

Television
 Comedy Circus Ke Mahabali as Khushboo
 Dil Dosti Dance as Khushboo Meerchandani
 Rang Badalti Odhani as Khushboo Khandelwal
 Chhajje Chhajje Ka Pyaar as Lipika Mahajan
 Ramleela – Ajay Devgn Ke Saath – Life OK
 Ishaan – Disney
 VJ for B4U Movies channel from 2002 to 2008
 Barrister Roy as Varsha – DD National (2006)
 Presenter for Just TV Punjabi channel

Filmography
 Aa Gaye Munde U.K. De (Punjabi) as Lovely
 Bhaji in Problem (Punjabi) as Jasmeet
 Carry On Jatta (Punjabi) as Preet
 Munde U.K. De (Punjabi) as Candy
 Raaz: The Mystery Continues as Karen
 Paisa Yaar n Panga as Waniya

As a playback singer

Awards
 2013: Nominated for the Best Supporting Actress Award at the PTC Punjabi Film Awards

References

External links
 

Actresses in Punjabi cinema
Indian television actresses
Indian women playback singers
Punjabi-language singers
Bollywood playback singers
1984 births
Living people
Musicians from Chandigarh
Women artists from Chandigarh
21st-century Indian women singers
21st-century Indian singers